Taniyama Tameike Dam is a gravity dam located in Gifu Prefecture in Japan. The dam is used for flood control and irrigation. The catchment area of the dam is 2.2 km2. The dam impounds about 4  ha of land when full and can store 268 thousand cubic meters of water. The construction of the dam was started on 1950 and completed in 1953.

References

Dams in Gifu Prefecture